Palosco is a comune (municipality) in the Province of Bergamo in the Italian region of Lombardy, located about  east of Milan and about  southeast of Bergamo.

Palosco borders the following municipalities: Bolgare, Calcinate, Cividate al Piano, Martinengo, Mornico al Serio, Palazzolo sull'Oglio, Pontoglio, Telgate.

The surnames Paloschi y Palloschi are believed to be toponyms for Palosco (Palösch in  
dialetto bergamasco

Demographic evolution

Notable people from Palosco
Giovanni Gasparini (born 1908), football player

References